Yigal Kipnis (born October 28, 1949) is an Israeli historian and author.

Biography
Yigal Kipnis earned a BSc in civil engineering from the Technion in Haifa (1977), and completed his MA (2003) and PhD (2006) in Land of Israel Studies at Haifa University. He served as a helicopter pilot in the Israeli Air Force for 31 years, of which 26 were in the reserves. Kipnis has lived on Moshav Ma'ale Gamla since 1978.

Published works
The Golan Heights: Political History, Settlement and Geography since 1949 (Routledge, 2013): The book presents Kipnis’ research on the settlement landscape in the Golan Heights on the eve of the Six-Day War and documents the rural Jewish settlement process in the Golan following the war, since 1967. Relations between Israel and Syria throughout this period are analyzed.

1973: The Road to War (Just World Books, 2013): The book deals with the circumstances leading to the 1973 war and the public discourse about it. In it, Kipnis reveals documentation of secret channels between US Secretary of State Henry Kissinger and the Israeli prime minister, Golda Meir, and between Kissinger and President Sadat of Egypt. Sadat's peace initiative, supported by President Nixon and Kissinger, was rejected by Israel's prime minister, resulting in the outbreak of the 1973 war. The documentation affirms the central role of political considerations and reduces the role of the intelligence failure when examining the factors leading to war.

References

Israeli historians
1949 births
Living people
University of Haifa alumni